Klaus Schlichte is a German political scientist. He is Professor for international relations at University of Bremen.

Education 
Schlichte studied political science, Africa science and economy at Hamburg University and University of Bordeaux. In 1995 he erarned a Ph.D. from University of Hamburg in political science. In 2006 he got his Habilitation in political science from Goethe University Frankfurt.

Career 
From 2007 to 2010 Schlichte was professor for political science at Otto von Guericke University Magdeburg. Since 2010 he is professor at University of Bremen.

Research 

Schlichte is discriping its own scientific work as international political sociology. He is also interested in sociology of the state and issues about political violence.

References

International relations scholars
University of Hamburg alumni
German political scientists
Living people
Philosophers of social science
Year of birth missing (living people)
University of Bordeaux alumni